Peter Karlsson (born 4 August 1961) is a retired Swedish football striker. Together with Sören Börjesson, he became joint top goalscorer of Allsvenskan in 1985.

References

1961 births
Living people
Swedish footballers
Åtvidabergs FF players
Kalmar FF players
Örgryte IS players
U.D. Leiria players
Association football forwards
Allsvenskan players
Segunda Divisão players
Swedish expatriate footballers
Expatriate footballers in Portugal
Swedish expatriate sportspeople in Portugal